August Lederer (3 May 1857 in Böhmisch Leipa (Austria-Hungary) – 30 April 1936 in Vienna), was an Austrian industrialist and art collector whose art collection was looted by Nazis. He helped promote the artists of the Vienna Secession, notably Gustav Klimt.

Biography 

In 1892 Lederer married Serena Pulitzer (1867–1943).

With a business empire built on distilleries, the Lederer family became the second wealthiest in Vienna, using their fortune to support artists and acquire art, notable of the Vienna Secession.  

In 1912 the Lederers met Egon Schiele, who that year spent with them in Gy euxr a memorable Christmas, and became particularly friends with their son Erich, whom he painted and drew several times.

Art collection 
The Lederer's art collection was the largest and most important private collection of Gustav Klimt.

Lederer acquired the Beethoven Frieze from Carl Reininghaus in 1915.

Their relationship with Klimt was very friendly, intimate to the point that Elisabeth Franziska Lederer, born in 1894, was able to affirm during the Nazi period to be the adulterous daughter of the painter and to receive in 1940 a certificate of filiation establishing that she was only "Half-Jewish", while her two brothers, Erich and Fritz, were considered full Jews.

Gustav Klimt painted Portrait of Elisabeth Lederer between 1914 and 1916 for the Lederer family.

Nazi persecution and looting 
The Lederer's art collection was one of the first stolen by the Nazis in Austria.

The Gestapo seized most of the Lederer's art collection. The "Zentralstelle für Denkmalschutz" or so-called "Monument protection" and Vugesta were involved.

The Lederer collection, confiscated in 1938, was stored mainly at Immendorf Castle in Lower Austria, where it would have largely burned in early 1945 under poorly clarified circumstances - which seems to contradict the fact that Isolated paintings resurfaced after the war, which were returned to the heirs.

In 2013 the Lederer heirs initiated a lawsuit to claim restitution of the Beethoven Frieze. Austria refused the claim.

In 2018 a Swiss court in Geneva ordered that the Galerie Kornfeld respond to questions asked by the Lederer heirs concerning artworks by Klimt and Schiele.

Bibliography 
 Christian M. Nebehay,  (Gustav Klimt, Egon Schiele et la famille Lederer), Vienne, 1979.
 Tobias G. Natter et Gerbert Frodl,  (Klimt et les femmes), Cologne-Vienne, 2000.

References

External links
 Beitrag über das Gartenpalais Huldenberg auf PLANET VIENNA mit historischen Abbildungen Article sur les anciens palais et jardins Huldenberg à Vienne.

Pages with unreviewed translations
1857 births
1936 deaths
Austrian industrialists
Austrian art collectors
Jewish art collectors
Austro-Hungarian Jews
Austrian Jews
20th-century Austrian Jews
Nazi-looted art
Patrons of the arts
Subjects of Nazi art appropriations